"Mauritia Mayer" is the fourth single by English gothic rock band Sex Gang Children, and their first on Clay Records. It reached No. 7 on the UK Indie Singles Chart.

References

1983 singles
Sex Gang Children songs
1983 songs